In operator algebra, the Koecher–Vinberg theorem is a reconstruction theorem for real Jordan algebras. It was proved independently by Max Koecher in 1957 and Ernest Vinberg in 1961. It provides a one-to-one correspondence between formally real Jordan algebras and so-called domains of positivity. Thus it links operator algebraic and convex order theoretic views on state spaces of physical systems.

Statement

A convex cone  in a vector space  with an inner product has a dual cone . The cone is called self-dual when . It is called homogeneous when to any two points  there is a real linear transformation  that restricts to a bijection  and satisfies .

The Koecher–Vinberg theorem now states that these properties precisely characterize the positive cones of Jordan algebras.

Theorem: There is a one-to-one correspondence between formally real Jordan algebras and convex cones that are:
 open;
 regular;
 homogeneous;
 self-dual.

Convex cones satisfying these four properties are called domains of positivity or symmetric cones. The domain of positivity associated with a real Jordan algebra  is the interior of the 'positive' cone .

Proof

References

Non-associative algebras
Theorems in algebra